The Uganda cricket team toured Namibia in April 2021 to play a three-match Twenty20 International (T20I) series and two 50-over matches. All of the matches were played at the Wanderers Cricket Ground in Windhoek.

Namibia won the first T20I match on 3 April by seven wickets, with captain Gerhard Erasmus leading the chase with 62 not out from just 36 balls. Two further victories for the hosts on 5 April, the first of which was rain affected, meant the hosts swept the T20I series 3–0.

Namibia won the first 50-over match thanks to some powerful batting by JJ Smit and Michael Van Lingen in the second half of their innings, followed by a five-wicket haul for Ruben Trumpelmann which included the first four wickets of the Ugandan chase that had left the visitors on just 9/4. Uganda recovered from a poor start to their run chase, led by a century for Ronak Patel, but were eventually all out 98 runs short of Namibia's total. Namibia comfortably won the second match by 162 runs after openers Stephan Baard and Divan la Cock put on a partnership of 150 runs, Baard top scoring with 145 in the host's total of 355/9.

Squads

Ugandan captain Brian Masaba missed the tour due to injury, with Arnold Otwani chosen to lead the side in his absence.

T20I series

1st T20I

2nd T20I

3rd T20I

50-over series

1st 50-over match

2nd 50-over match

References

External links
 Series home at ESPN Cricinfo

Associate international cricket competitions in 2020–21